Shaan is an 2022 Bangladeshi action thriller film based on true story. The film stars Siam Ahmed, Puja Cherry Roy, Champa, Taskeen Rahman & Aruna Biswas. It is director M Raahim's debut film, who was assistant director of Siam Ahmed's first two films Poramon 2 & Dahan. With this film, Champa & Aruna Biswas will collaborate after 26 years. The screenplay of the film is written by reputed thriller writer Nazim Ud Daula, based on the story of Mr. Azad Khan.

The film is produced by Quick Multimedia & will be distributed by Jaaz Multimedia.

The film was released on May 3, 2022; after being postponed multiple times due to the COVID-19 pandemic.

Plot
The story of the film revolves around Shaan, who, after passing the Bangladesh Civil Service examinations, joins the police force to serve the nation. He is an honest and courageous police officer.

Cast
Siam Ahmed as Shaan
 Puja Cherry as Riya
 Misha Sawdagor
 Taskeen Rahman
 Champa as Shaan's mother
 Aruna Biswas as Riya's mother
 Nader Chowdhury as Dr.Asad Chowdhury
 Syed Hasan Imam
 Monuwar Hussain as Aadi
 Amjad Hossen as Police
 Imam Hossain Saju
 Arafat Hassan Sohan as Police Officer

 Al Yasaha Naim as Al Yasaha

Reception

Box Office 
Shaan Grossed About of above ৳2 Crore In the domestic box office. Later it got released on Malaysia,Australia,France & USA theaters. Gaining $1,475 On opening and overall of $3,114 box office in Worldwide Box office Making The Movie to Grossed about 2.65-3.0 crore in the box office collection. However the movie was claimed as a flop because of the production budget of it was ৳4 crore

References  

Bengali-language Bangladeshi films
Films postponed due to the COVID-19 pandemic